Mystery Manor is a hidden object game developed by Game Insight. It was launched on 2010 on the Facebook social media platform, it was the first game of the genre in Facebook.
It was launched for Android and IOS in 2012.

Gameplay
Mystery Manor is a hidden object (sometimes known as hidden picture) game. Players are given a list of items to find within a static scene. They then receive points for each item found, and score multipliers for completing the task quickly. Players can also use compasses to highlight items that they find difficult to see, snails to add time or hourglasses to freeze time. In between many of the levels, puzzle levels require players to find and assemble the collections of the manor. 
Mystery Manor also has a map of the manor, in which players see the keys required to visit the rooms. Sometimes there are quests in the yard of the manor. Coins, jewels and experience are needed to unlock further rooms and floors in the game. Players must also defeat, trade with, or banish monsters in order to protect the manor. New chapters of the story are written every season (winter in the manor, summer in the manor, Christmas in the manor).
Each room in the Manor cycles through multiple "Exploration Modes".
 Word mode - Provides a list with the names of the objects that have to be found.
 Silhouette mode - Provides a list with the black outlines of the objects that have to be found.
 Night Mode - Provides a list with the names of the objects that have to be found and keeps most of the screen darkened, except for a player-controlled spotlight.
 Comparison Mode - Provides two side by side images of the room, with the goal being to "spot the difference" between the two images.

Narrative
Mystery Manor is set in the mansion of Mister X, a large and isolated house full of secrets and strange phenomena.
A no-named visitor (the player) arrives to the manor and meets Katherine, Mister X's secretary, who tells the visitor about the game.

Characters
 Mr. and Mrs. X: the mysterious owners of the manor.
 Katherine: the secretary, she helps the player with quests. She wants to escape out of the manor.
 Elsa: the German maid, she is almost always frightened.
 Giovanni: the Italian chef, he always wants the player to find some ingredient. He and Elsa are in love.
 Jones: the British hunter. He is the guard of the manor. He and his friend Rudolph Van Helsing keep away the monsters (vampires, zombies, homunculus, werewolfs, skeletons...).
 Magda: the old gipsy witch. She works in the fortune-telling room and her cat is named Voldemort. Runes, ouija boards, incense burners, potions and other stuff are used by Magda.
 Takeshi: the Japanese gardener. He was a ninja and always speaks with haikus. He is so quiet and sometimes elusive.
 Joanna: a middle-age woman who is the librarian of the manor. She reads and writes a lot and is an expert in rare books and grimoires. She often helps Jones and eventually they fall in love.

Monetization
Mystery Manor is a free-to-play game, using the freemium model of monetization. Players can use real-life money to buy in-game coins, tools and jewels. These can then be used to buy extra energy, which is required to play the scenes, and gears, which are required to unlock new scenes.

Reception
Reviews for Mystery Manor are generally good. with many reviewers praising its high production values, and disapproving of its freemium monetization structure.

References

Facebook games
IOS games
Puzzle video games
Hidden object games
2010 video games
Android (operating system) games
Video games developed in Russia
Game Insight games